Kyla is a given name, and may refer to:

Music 
 Kyla (Filipino singer), Filipino R&B singer Melanie C. Alvarez's stage name
 Kyla (British singer), (Kyla Reid), British singer
 Kyla Brox, British singer
 Kyla Greenbaum, British pianist
 Kyla La Grange, British musician
 Kyla-Rose Smith, South African musician

Sports 
 Kyla Atienza, Filipina volleyball player
 Kyla Bremner, an Olympic athlete
 Kyla Inquig, Filipina footballer
 Kyla Leibel (born 2001), Canadian swimmer
 Kyla Richey, Canadian volleyball player
 Kyla Ross, an American gymnast

Other 
 Kyla Cole (born 1978), Slovak glamour model
 Kyla Garcia, American actress
 Kyla Kenedy (born 2003), American actress
 Kyla Pratt (born 1986), American actress
 Kyla Tyson, a fictional character on the television series Holby City
 Kyla Ward, Australian author

See also

 Cala (disambiguation)
 Kaila (disambiguation)
 Kala (disambiguation)
 Kayla (disambiguation)
 Kila (disambiguation)